"I Come With Knives" is the second release taken from the fifth IAMX studio album The Unified Field. On 8 February 2013, it made its world premiere on Berlin-based radio station Flux FM. The video was premiered on 1 March.

Music video
The video, shot in Joshua Tree, California, shows Chris in dark clothes running around the barren landscape as live band members Janine Gezang and Sammi Doll dance about.

Lyrics
The German samples:

Kinder und Sterne küssen und verlieren sich

Greifen leise meine Hand und führen mich

Die Traumgötter brachten mich in eine Landschaft

Schmetterlinge flatterten durch meine Seele

In der Mitternacht

translate as follows:
Children and stars are kissing and losing themselves (or: each other)
Quietly taking my hand and leading me
The gods of dreams brought me to a landscape
Butterflies fly through my soul
At midnight

References

2013 singles
IAMX songs
2013 songs
Songs written by Chris Corner